Rauwshan Isaam McKenzie (born November 19, 1986 in Stamford, Connecticut) is an American soccer player.

Career

College and Amateur
McKenzie played college soccer for Michigan State University from 2004 to 2007. In 2004, he was named to the Freshman All-Big-10 team, and as a senior in 2007 he was selected 1st Team All-Big-10. During his college years, McKenzie also played for the Michigan Bucks and the Chicago Fire Premier in the Premier Development League.

Professional
McKenzie was drafted in the fourth round (53rd overall) of the 2008 MLS SuperDraft by Kansas City Wizards. He made his full professional debut for the Wizards on July 8, 2008 in the U.S. Open Cup quarter final against Seattle Sounders.

McKenzie was released by the Wizards on February 8, 2010. He was claimed on waivers by Real Salt Lake days later. McKenzie remained with RSL through the 2011 season. At season's end, the club declined his 2012 contract option and he entered the 2011 MLS Re-Entry Draft. McKenzie was not selected in the draft and became a free agent.

He signed with Chivas USA on February 22, 2012. Chivas USA released McKenzie exactly one year later on February 22, 2013.

On May 22, 2013, McKenzie signed with Portland Timbers. He scored his first Timbers goal in the 72nd minute of a CONCACAF Champions League match against CD Olimpia on September 16, 2014, which the Timbers would win 4-2.

McKenzie signed with NASL club Atlanta Silverbacks on March 18, 2015.

On January 15, 2016, McKenzie was announced as one of the first three players signed by North American Soccer League expansion side Rayo OKC.

References

External links

1986 births
Living people
American soccer players
Association football defenders
Atlanta Silverbacks players
Chicago Fire U-23 players
Chivas USA players
Major League Soccer players
Flint City Bucks players
Michigan State Spartans men's soccer players
North American Soccer League players
Orange County SC players
People from Hoffman Estates, Illinois
Portland Timbers players
Rayo OKC players
Real Salt Lake players
Soccer players from Illinois
Sporting Kansas City draft picks
Sporting Kansas City players
USL Championship players
USL League Two players